Zdzisław Szlapkin (born January 18, 1961 in Chodzież, Wielkopolskie) is a male former racewalker from Poland, who represented his native country at the 1988 Summer Olympics in Seoul, South Korea. He set his personal best (1:20.52) in the men's 20 km walk event in 1988.

Achievements

References
 sports-reference

1961 births
Living people
Polish male racewalkers
Athletes (track and field) at the 1988 Summer Olympics
Olympic athletes of Poland
People from Chodzież
Sportspeople from Greater Poland Voivodeship